Guilherme de Andrade e Almeida (born in Campinas, July 24, 1890 and died in Sao Paulo, July 11, 1969) was a lawyer, journalist, film critic, poet, essayist and Brazilian translator. He helped popularize the Japanese poem style, haiku, in Brazil.

He is the son of Estevão de Araújo Almeida, a law teacher and jurist, and Angelina Andrade Almeida.

He married Belkiss Barroso de Almeida, and they had a son, Guy Sérgio Haroldo Estevão Zózimo Barroso de Almeida, who married Marina Queiroz Aranha de Almeida.

He fought in the Constitutionalist Revolution of 1932. His greatest work of love to São Paulo was his poem, Nossa Bandeira (Our Flag), but he also wrote Moeda Paulista (São Paulo Coin) and the poignant Oração ante a última trincheira (Prayer at the last ditch"). He was proclaimed The poet of the Revolution.

He also wrote the letter "Canção do Expedicionário" ("Song of the Expeditionary") with music by Spartaco Rossi and pracinhas brasileiros in World War II.

References

1890 births
1969 deaths
Brazilian male journalists
Brazilian male poets
Brazilian translators
20th-century Brazilian poets
20th-century translators
20th-century Brazilian male writers
20th-century Brazilian lawyers
20th-century journalists